Sicyopterus stimpsoni, commonly known as the Nopoli rockclimbing goby, oopu nopili, or Stimpson's goby, is a species of amphidromous goby endemic to Hawaii.  This species can reach a length of  SL.

Ecology
Juveniles move from saltwater to freshwater streams shortly before changes in the anatomy of their mouths make eating plankton impossible. Their dietary behaviour depends critically on the benthic algal cycle, which is locked into the hydrological cycles of the island streams.

The species in its adult form is found in the upper parts of clear, fast-running mountain streams, where there is clean gravel and rocks with no sedimentation, allowing the growth of algae on rock surfaces. It is found on all the Hawaiian Islands, although it has become rare on O‘ahu. The species is herbivorous, feeding only on diatoms and filamentous algae, and vigorously defending its feeding patch. The fish cultivate gardens on the upper surfaces of stones and boulders. Here they encourage a short turf of diatoms, filamentous algae and blue-green algae. The males guard these territorial gardens and they play a part in courtship.

The males display brilliant blue and red colours during the breeding season, colours which change with the mood of the fish. The females attach their eggs to rocks where they are fertilised by the males, and the hatchlings are immediately washed downstream into the sea, where they develop, later to return to the freshwater pools upstream, where they live for several years.  To arrive at these pools the juveniles need to climb the vertical rock under and beside very high waterfalls. The climbing is postponed until their mouthparts have moved from a forward-facing position to under the body. This change is effected in two days, altering their diet from that of an omnivore to feeding almost exclusively on algae growing on the rock surfaces, and not coincidentally enabling them to ascend slippery waterfall rocks by using mouth and pelvic suckers.

It is preyed upon by black-crowned night herons and during its upstream migration through the estuary by Caranx spp., Polydactylus sexfilis and Sphyraena barracuda.

Conservation
Five of the seven native freshwater fish species on Hawaii are gobioid. Three of these gobioids, S. stimpsoni (this article), Awaous stamineus (endemic) and Lentipes concolor (endemic) are amphidromous stream dwellers, which are adapted to the steep torrents of Hawaii's mountains (Eleotris sandwicensis and Stenogobius hawaiiensis, both endemic, are unable to pass steep torrents). This makes them extremely sensitive to habitat disturbance.

Etymology
The specific name honours the marine biologist William Stimpson (1832-1872), who was the collector of the type specimen.

References

External links
Hawaii Division of Aquatic Resources
Sicyopterus rapa
Study: Waterfall-Climbing Fish Use Same Mechanism To Climb Waterfalls And Eat Algae, UnderwaterTimes.com, 4 January 2013
 
 Meet the amazing, waterfall-climbing fish Science, 13 January 2013.
 Cullen JA, Maie T, Schoenfuss HL and Blob RW (2012) "Evolutionary novelty versus exaptation: Oral kinematics in feeding versus climbing in the waterfall-climbing Hawaiian goby Sicyopterus stimpsoni" PLoS ONE, 8(1): e53274. 

Sicyopterus
Endemic fauna of Hawaii
Freshwater fish of Hawaii
Fish of Hawaii
Taxa named by Theodore Gill
Fish described in 1860
Taxonomy articles created by Polbot